The 2018 United States House of Representatives elections in Rhode Island were held on November 6, 2018, to elect the two U.S. representatives from the state of Rhode Island, one from each of the state's 2 congressional districts. The election coincided with the 2018 U.S. mid-term elections, as well as other elections to the House of Representatives, elections to the United States Senate and various state and local elections. The primaries took place on September 12.

Following the 2018 elections, the Democratic Party retained control of both House seats, and also retained control of the entirety of Rhode Island's Congressional (House and Senate) delegation.

Overview
Results of the 2018 United States House of Representatives elections in Rhode Island by district:

District 1

The 1st district includes the capital, Providence and the surrounding Narragansett Bay area. This district has a PVI of D+14. Democrat David Cicilline has represented the district since 2010.

Democratic primary
Declared
David Cicilline, incumbent
Chris Young, electrical engineer

Primary results

Republican primary
Declared
Patrick Donovan, Newport, Rhode Island resident
Frederick Wysocki, financial advisor

Primary results

General election

Results

District 2

The 2nd district is located in western and southern Rhode Island, including Coventry, Cranston, and Warwick. The district has a PVI of D+6. Democrat James Langevin has represented this district since 2001.

Democratic primary
Declared
James Langevin, incumbent

Primary results

Republican primary
Declared
Sal Caiozzo, businessman

Primary results

General election

Results

See also

2018 United States House of Representatives elections
2018 United States elections
2018 United States Senate election in Rhode Island
2018 Rhode Island gubernatorial election

References

External links
Official campaign websites for first district candidates
David Cicilline (D) for Congress

Official campaign websites for second district candidates
Sal Caiozzo (R) for Congress
James Langevin (D) for Congress

2018
Rhode Island
United States House of Representatives